Rowing at the 1936 Summer Olympics featured seven events, for men only. The competitions were held from 11 to 14 August on a regatta course at Grünau on the Langer See.

The competition was dominated by the hosts, Germany, who medaled in every event and took five of the seven gold medals. The final race, men's eights, was won by a working-class United States team from the University of Washington who, in what had become their trademark, started slow and outsprinted the competition to an exceedingly close finish, with only one second separating the top three finishers at the end of a six-and-a-half minute race. This event is chronicled in The Boys in the Boat written by Daniel James Brown.

Medal summary

Participating nations
A total of 313 rowers from 24 nations competed at the Berlin Games:

Medal table

References

Further reading
 Six Minutes in Berlin: Broadcast Spectacle and Rowing Gold at the Nazi Olympics by Michael J. Socolow, 2016, University of Illinois Press

 
1936 Summer Olympics events
1936
Oly